The Turkish Women's Ice Hockey League, also known as the Kadınlar Ligi in Turkish, is a women's amateur ice hockey league in Turkey. It is operated under the jurisdiction of the Turkish Ice Hockey Federation, a member of the International Ice Hockey Federation. Each team is allowed to carry two import players per season. The season typically starts in late November – early December and finishes in April.

The 2009–10 season consisted of 11 teams split up into three groups; Orta (Center) A and B consisting of teams from Ankara whereas the Marmara + Doğu (East) group consists of teams from Istanbul, İzmit and Erzurum.

The champion of the league qualifies for the IIHF European Women's Champions Cup.

League seasons

2009–10 season

Orta (Center) A Group

Orta (Center) B Group

 Marmara + Doğu (East) C Group

2014–15 season
Five teams competed in the 2014–15 season. Narmanspor finished the season champion defeating Milenyum Paten SK in the playoffs.

Season awards.
 Best Goaltender: Kübra Dadaşoğlu, Narmanspor
 Best Defenceman: İlkim Dilan Uygun, Milenyum Paten SK
 Best Forward: Betül Taygar, Narmanspor

2015–16 season
The 2015–16 TBHF Women's League was played with seven teams. From the previous season, Milenyum Paten SK did not participated. The teams ODTÜ SK from Ankara, Pars SK and Zeytinburnu Belediyesi SK from Istanbul joined the league.

The league champion became Istanbul-based Buz Korsanları defeating Narmanspor by 3–2 in the play-offs.

Champions

IIHF European Women's Champions Cup

2007–08 EWCC Group B
2006–07 League champion Büyükşehir Belediyesi Ankara Spor Kulübü played in the first round of the 2007–08 IIHF European Women's Champions Cup Group B held on October 5–7, 2007, in Martin, Slovakia. The winner of each group qualifies for the next round.

2008–09 EWCC Group A
2007–08 League champion Polis Akademisi ve Koleji played in the first round of the 2008–09 IIHF European Women's Champions Cup Group A held on October 24–26, 2008, in Prague, Czech Republic. The winner of each group qualifies for the next round.

2009–10 EWCC Group C
2008–09 League champion Milenyum Paten SK traveled to Prague, Czech Republic to compete in the first round of the 2009–10 IIHF European Women's Champions Cup Group C from October 30 to November 1, 2009. The winner of each group qualifies for the next round.

2010–11 EWCC Group B
2009–10 League champion Milenyum Paten SK hosted the first round of the 2010–11 IIHF European Women's Champions Cup Group B held on October 29–31, 2014. The winner of each group qualifies for the next round.

2011–12 EWCC Group B
2010–11 League champion Milenyum Paten SK played in the first round of the 2011–12 IIHF European Women's Champions Cup Group B held on October 28–30, 2011, in Miercurea Ciuc, Romania. The winner of each group qualifies for the next round.

2012–13 EWCC Group B
2011–12 League champion Milenyum Paten SK played in the first round of the 2012–13 IIHF European Women's Champions Cup Group B held on October 19–21, 2012, in Molodechno, Belarus. The winner of each group qualifies for the next round.

2014–15 EWCC Group A
2013–14 League champion Milenyum Paten SK hosted the first round of the 2014–15 IIHF European Women's Champions Cup Group A held on October 17–19, 2014. The winner of each group qualifies for the next round.

See also
Turkey national women's ice hockey team
Turkish Ice Hockey Super League
Turkish Ice Hockey First League

References

Women's ice hockey leagues in Europe
Women's ice hockey in Turkey
Sports leagues established in 2007
2007 establishments in Turkey
Ice hockey
Women's